Stanislav Bilenkyi (born 22 August 1998) is a Ukrainian professional footballer who plays as a striker for Maccabi Netanya

Career
Bilenkyi is a product of the FC Shakhtar and FC Olimpik School Systems in his native Donetsk.

He played in the Ukrainian Premier League Reserves and made his debut for Olimpik Donetsk in the Ukrainian Premier League in a match against Zorya Luhansk on 31 May 2017.

On 17 December 2021, he signed a two-year contract with Georgian club Dinamo Tbilisi.

Honours
Rukh Lviv
 Ukrainian First League: 2019–20

DAC Dunajská Streda
 Slovak Super Liga: Runners-up 2018–19

Individual
 Top scorer Ukrainian Premier League Reserves: 2016–17

References

External links
 

1998 births
Living people
Footballers from Donetsk
Ukrainian footballers
Association football forwards
FC Olimpik Donetsk players
FC DAC 1904 Dunajská Streda players
Zagłębie Sosnowiec players
FC Rukh Lviv players
FC Dynamo Brest players
FC Dinamo Tbilisi players
Maccabi Netanya F.C. players
Ukrainian Premier League players
Slovak Super Liga players
I liga players
Belarusian Premier League players
Erovnuli Liga players
Israeli Premier League players
Ukrainian expatriate footballers
Expatriate footballers in Slovakia
Expatriate footballers in Poland
Expatriate footballers in Belarus
Expatriate footballers in Georgia (country)
Expatriate footballers in Israel
Ukrainian expatriate sportspeople in Slovakia
Ukrainian expatriate sportspeople in Poland
Ukrainian expatriate sportspeople in Belarus
Ukrainian expatriate sportspeople in Georgia (country)
Ukrainian expatriate sportspeople in Israel
Ukraine youth international footballers
Ukraine under-21 international footballers